Patrice is the fourth, self-titled album by R&B singer Patrice Rushen.

Reception

This marked Patrice's first album with Elektra Records after making three jazz-oriented albums with Prestige Records.  With this album, Rushen makes a switch from jazz to a more R&B/pop music style.  The album was heavily criticized by jazz's hardcore audience and Rushen was accused of being a sellout.  She was vilified in the jazz media due to this transition, as many believed that the reason for her transition was due to commercial reasons.

In this album Patrice demonstrated that she could be an expressive, charming singer, and her writing on cuts range from the funky "Hang It Up" and the ballad "Didn't You Know?" to the socio-political "Changes (In Your Life)." With Patrice, the Los Angeles native made it clear that she could appeal to the R&B and pop markets, just as her success as a jazz pianist/keyboardist.  Her next album to be released would be Pizzazz.

The album got re-released on CD in 2003 by Wounded Bird Records.

Track listing
 "Music of the Earth" (Patrice Rushen, Angela Rushen) - 3:58
 "When I Found You" (Patrice Rushen, Tony Coleman, Angela Rushen) - 5:20
 "Changes (In Your Life)" (Patrice Rushen, Angela Rushen) - 4:08
 "Wishful Thinking" (Patrice Rushen) - 5:08
 "Let's Sing a Song of Love" (Patrice Rushen, Reggie Andrews) - 3:43
 "Hang It Up" (Patrice Rushen) - 5:11
 "Cha-Cha" (Patrice Rushen, Sheree North, Angela Rushen) - 3:22
 "It's Just a Natural Thing" (Patrice Rushen, Freddie Washington) - 3:20
 "Didn't You Know?" (Patrice Rushen, Sheree Brown) - 5:17
 "Play!" (Patrice Rushen, Charles Mims, Jr.) - 4:36

Personnel 
 Patrice Rushen – arrangements (1-7, 9),  backing vocals (1-4, 6-10), Rhodes piano (1, 2, 5, 6, 7, 9, 10), synthesizers (1), lead vocals (2, 3, 4, 7, 9), percussion (2, 9, 10), clavinet (3, 8, 10), synth bass (3), tambourine (3), acoustic guitar (4), electric grand piano (5, 10), acoustic piano (6), lead guitar (8), rhythm guitar (8), drums (8, 9), celesta (9), bass (9)
 Charles Mims Jr. – Rhodes piano (4), backing vocals (6), acoustic piano (8), arrangements (8, 10), synthesizers (10)
 Marlo Henderson – guitar (1, 5, 6, 7, 9, 10), Ovation guitar (2), fuzz lead guitar (3)
 Al McKay – guitar (1, 2, 3, 5, 6, 7, 10)
 Abraham Laboriel – acoustic guitar (1), bass (4)
 Paul Jackson Jr. – rhythm acoustic guitar (9), hi-strung guitar (9)
 Freddie Washington – bass (1, 2, 3, 5-8, 10)
 James Gadson – drums (1-7, 10)
 Paulinho da Costa – percussion (1, 4, 5, 7)
 Bill Summers – percussion (6, 7, 10)
 Kim Hutchcroft – alto saxophone (1, 2, 5, 6, 8, 10)
 Larry Williams – tenor saxophone (1, 2, 5, 6, 8, 10), clarinet (4)
 Bill Reichenbach Jr. – trombone (1, 6, 10), baritone (2), bass trombone (5, 8)
 Maurice Spears – bass trombone (1, 2, 6, 10)
 George Bohanon – trombone (5, 8)
 Oscar Brashear – trumpet (1), flugelhorn (2)
 Raymond Lee Brown – trumpet (1, 5, 6, 8, 10), flugelhorn (2, 9)
 Jerry Hey – trumpet (5, 6, 8, 10)
 William Green – clarinet (4)
 Valerie King – flute (4)
 Jeff Clayton – oboe (4)
 Dave Riddles – bassoon (4)
 Kenneth Yerke – whistle (4)
 Clay Lawrey – baritone (9)
 Roy Galloway – backing vocals (1, 2, 3, 5, 6, 9, 10)
 Pauline Wilson – backing vocals (1)
 Syreeta Wright – backing vocals (1-4, 6, 9, 10)
 Jim Gilstrap – backing vocals (2, 3, 5, 8, 10)
 Stephanie Spruill – backing vocals (3, 8)
 Sheree Brown – backing vocals (4, 5, 6, 9)
 Oren Waters – backing vocals (5, 6, 8)
 Reggie Andrews – backing vocals (6)
 Maxine Willard Waters – backing vocals (8)

Handclaps and Fingersnaps
 Gerald Albright, Reggie Andrews, Sheree Brown, Tony Coleman, Roy Galloway, Debra Jones, Tony Lewis, Eric McKain, Charles Mims Jr., Phil Moores, Bill Pegg, Laverne Peterson, Patrice Rushen, Freddie Washington and Oren Waters

Strings (Tracks 1, 2, 4, 5 & 9)
 Patrice Rushen – arrangements and conductor (1, 2, 4, 9)
 Reggie Andrews – arrangements and conductor (5)
 Gerald Vinci – concertmaster (1, 2)
 Charles Veal Jr. – concertmaster (4, 5, 9)
 Ronald Cooper, Selene Hurford, Ray Kelley, Ron Leonard, Edgar Lustgarten and Harry Shlutz – cello 
 Denyse Buffum, Rollice Dale, Mark Kovacs, Virginia Majewski, Carole Mukogawa, Art Royval and Barbara Thomason – viola 
 Israel Baker, Arnold Belnick, Harry Bluestone, Alfred Breuning, Bonnie Douglas, Assa Drori, Frank Foster, Harris Goldman, Endre Granat, Connie Kupka, Carl LaMagna, Barbara Nord, Henry Roth, Sheldon Sanov, Sandy Seymour, Paul Shure, Barry Socher, Marcia Van Dyke, Dorothy Wade and Kenneth Yerke – violin

Charts

Singles

Samples & Covers
Hieroglyphics sampled "Didn't You Know?" on their song "You Never Knew" on their album 3rd Eye Vision in 1998.

References

External links
 Patrice Rushen-Patrice at Discogs

1978 albums
Patrice Rushen albums
Elektra Records albums